The 2017–18 snooker season was a series of professional snooker tournaments played between 4 May 2017 and 7 May 2018. The season began with the pro–am Vienna Snooker Open in May 2017 and ended with the 2018 World Snooker Championship in April the following year. Ronnie O'Sullivan earned a joint-record five ranking titles in the season. He joined Stephen Hendry (1990/1991), Ding Junhui (2013/2014), and Mark Selby (2016/2017) in winning five ranking titles in the same season.

The China Championship became a ranking event and was brought forward to a mid-August date, ahead of the Paul Hunter Classic. The Shanghai Masters was initially withdrawn from the season calendar, but was later rescheduled for November 2017. The biennial World Cup team event was played in July 2017. Another event not held every year returning in 2017 was the 2017 IWGA World Games. The Snooker Shoot Out was brought forward to the start of February, ahead of both the World Grand Prix and Welsh Open.

A new World Seniors Tour was formed by Snooker Legends for players over 40 years of age, comprising four events, including the World Seniors Championship which has returned to Scunthorpe in 2018.

The second edition of the Home Nations Series was being held in this season with the English Open, Northern Ireland Open, Scottish Open and Welsh Open tournaments. For a single winner of all four tournaments would earn a bonus of £1 million.

Ronnie O'Sullivan won five ranking events during the season, with Mark Williams winning three times and Ryan Day, John Higgins and Mark Selby each winning twice. Shaun Murphy reached four ranking event finals during the season but lost them all.

Players

The top 64 players from the prize money rankings after the 2017 World Championship, and the 31 players earning a two-year card the previous year automatically qualified for the season (Rouzi Maimaiti has resigned his membership). Next, eight places were allocated to the top 8 on the One Year Ranking List who have not already qualified for the Main Tour. Another two players came from the EBSA Qualifying Tour Play-Offs, and a further 12 places were available through the Q School (four Event 1 winners, four Event 2 winners, and four best-ranked players in the Order of Merit). The rest of the places on to the tour came from amateur events and national governing body (NGB) nominations. Hamza Akbar received a tour card as a special dispensation in place of America's nomination.

The list of all professional players in the 2017/2018 season consist of 131 players, including the standard field of the 128 players and three invitational tour cards (James Wattana has second year of a two-year invitational tour card while Jimmy White and Ken Doherty were awarded the new two-year permission). Beginning from this season, players with invitational tour cards are eligible to compete in any ranking event. These players are seeded after main tour professionals, but above amateur top ups taken from the Q School ranking list.

New professional players
All players listed below received a tour card for two seasons.

International champions
IBSF World Championship winner:  Soheil Vahedi
IBSF World Under-21 Championship winner:  Xu Si
EBSA European Championship winner:  Chris Totten

ACBS Asian Championship winner:  Lyu Haotian
ACBS Asian Under-21 Championship winner:  Yuan Sijun
ABSF African Championships winner:  Basem Eltahhan
Oceania Championship winner:  Matthew Bolton

One Year Ranking List

EBSA Qualifying Tour Play-Offs

Q School
Event 1

Event 2

Order of Merit

CBSA China Tour

Calendar
The following tables outline the dates and results of all events of the World Snooker Tour, World Women's Snooker, the World Seniors Tour, and other events.

World Snooker Tour

World Ladies Billiards and Snooker

World Seniors Tour

Other events

Points distribution 
2017/2018 points distribution for World Snooker Tour ranking events:

Notes

References

External links
Snooker season 2017/2018 at Snooker.org

Seasons in snooker
Season 2017
Season 2018